"Summertime" is the third single released by The Maybes? from their debut album, Promise. It was released on 25 August 2008 on Xtra Mile Recordings as a download and 7" Record.

Track listing
Download single
 "Summertime"

7" single
 "Summertime" – 2:46
 "The Fever" – 3:19

Personnel
Produced and mixed by Head (Track 1)
Engineered by Jim Anderson (Track 1)
Produced, engineered and mixed by Graeme Lycett and The Maybes? (Track 2)
Photography by Christian Petersen
Design by Lisa Robson
Xtra Mile Recordings
Universal Publishing

References
presscounsel.com (at Internet Archive)

External links
Myspace profile
Facebook page
Lyrics of this song – Summertime

2008 singles
2008 songs
Xtra Mile Recordings singles